Johnny or Johnnie Johnston is the name of:

 Johnnie Johnston (1915–1996), American actor and singer
 Johnny Johnston (baseball) (1890–1940), American baseball player
 Johnny Johnston (cricketer) (1953–2008), English cricketer
 Johnny Johnston (footballer) (born 1947), Northern Irish footballer
 Johnny Johnston, a member of the British vocal group The Johnston Brothers

See also
 John Johnston (disambiguation)